White Cross–Huntley Hall is a historic home located at Charlottesville, Virginia. It was built in 1891, and is a two-story Shingle Style dwelling.  It features stone walls, broad expanses of hipped and gable rooflines, circular tower, and small-paned windows.  The Charlottesville School for Boys occupied the house for over a decade in the 1930s-1940s.

It was listed on the National Register of Historic Places in 1982.

References

Houses on the National Register of Historic Places in Virginia
Queen Anne architecture in Virginia
Houses completed in 1891
Houses in Charlottesville, Virginia
National Register of Historic Places in Charlottesville, Virginia
Historic district contributing properties in Virginia